A Perfect Man is a 2015 French thriller film directed by Yann Gozlan. The film tells the story of a struggling author who discovers a manuscript, the war memoir of a man who has recently died and publishes it as his own work. The film stars Pierre Niney and Ana Girardot.

Cast 
 Pierre Niney as Mathieu Vasseur  
 Ana Girardot as Alice Fursac
 André Marcon as Alain Fursac 
 Valeria Cavalli as Hélène Fursac 
 Thibault Vinçon as Stanislas Richer 
 Marc Barbé as Vincent 
 Sacha Mijovic as Franck  
 Eric Savin as Gendarme   
 Laurent Grévill as Stéphane Marsan

Plot
Matthieu has had the manuscript of his first novel rejected repeatedly. When he discovers a manuscript among the abandoned possessions of a recently deceased man, he publishes it as his own work to great acclaim. He begins a relationship with Alice, a book critic. Years pass and he fails to produce another book and has spent what his first book earned as well as the advance he has received for his next work. He is blackmailed by a man who knows of and can prove he is a fraud even as others, especially Alice's brother, doubt his talent. In a confrontation he kills Alice's brother. In a burst of creative energy he writes a new novel, which he gives to Alice to read. Pursued by his blackmailer, he stages a car wreck to kill him and then retreats from life. Later, he comes across Alice in a bookstore with their newborn child, celebrating the posthumous publication of Matthieu's novel.

References

External links 
 

2015 films
2015 thriller films
2010s French-language films
French thriller films
Films about writers
2010s French films